"Vanilla" is a second single released by Gackt on August 11, 1999. It peaked at fourth place on the Oricon weekly chart and charted for ten weeks. It is Gackt's second best selling single, with 248,360 copies sold. "Vanilla" was re-released on March 20, 2002, when it peaked at number twelve and charted for 6 weeks. It was ceritifed gold by RIAJ.

Track listing

References

1999 singles
Gackt songs
1999 songs
Songs written by Gackt